Odense Zoo is a zoological garden in Odense, Denmark.

At the time of its opening in 1930, the zoo had two apes, a peacock, a deer, a mule, magpies, and guinea pigs. Today, the zoo has animals from all over the world, covering around 100 species such as chimpanzee, monkeys, ring-tailed lemur, Siberian tiger, Grévy's zebra, giraffe, red panda, West Indian manatee, ostrich, penguins, pink-backed pelican, greater flamingo, macaws and Aldabra giant tortoise. In 2001, Odense Zoo inaugurated a DKK 60 million "Oceanium" featuring South American animal life, ranging from the Amazon Rainforest to Antarctica.

In 2008, Odense Zoo was Funen's most popular tourist attraction and number 9 in Denmark, and in 2013 it received the "Best in Europe" award in its category (zoos with up to 500,000 visitors per year). The visitor record was set in the first year of the "Oceanium" when the zoo received 439,533 visitors.

Number of visitors 
 2008: 430,363
 2007: 420,254
 2006: 378,373
 2005: 433,795
 2004: 410,525
 2003: 417,370
 2002: 390,000 (approx.)
 2001: 439,533 (record)
 2000: 310,000
 1999: 335,000

References

External links 
 Odensezoo.dk, official site

1930 establishments in Denmark
Zoos in Denmark
Tourist attractions in Odense
Buildings and structures in Odense
Tourist attractions in the Region of Southern Denmark